Espinoza or Espinosa may refer to:

 Espinosa, Minas Gerais, a city in Minas Gerais, Brazil
 Espinosa de los Monteros, a city in Burgos, Spain
 Espinosa (Dorado), a division of Dorado, Puerto Rico
  Espinosa (wasp), a wasp genus in the subfamily Ormocerinae
 Espinosa (surname), people with the surname Espinoza or Espinosa

Other uses 
 Battle of Espinosa, 1808 battle in Spain during the Napoleonic Wars
 Ing. Fernando Espinoza Gutiérrez International Airport serving Santiago de Querétaro, Mexico
 Luisa Amanda Espinoza Association of Nicaraguan Women, Nicaraguan women’s political group

See also 
 Spinoza (disambiguation)
 Spinosa (disambiguation)